Vũ Minh Hiếu is a  retired Vietnamese football midfielder who spent his whole career with V-League club Công An Hà Nội, known as Hà Nội ACB today. He was the captain of his club. He was famous for his passing, close control, and free kicks, and was regarded as one of the best attacking midfielders in Vietnam. He was capped several times by Vietnam national team. However, he did not see his action with the success of the national team because the preferred tactics played by Vietnam national team at that time was 5-3-2, with Nguyen Hong Son as the favorite choice for the middle position in the midfield. Hieu's notable performance was in Seagames 19, where he came in as a substitution and scored 2 goals in the match with Laos after the Vietnamese led by 0-1 after the first half.

References

1972 births
Living people
Vietnamese footballers
Vietnam international footballers
Hanoi FC players
V.League 1 players
Association football midfielders